Kazaly is a district of Kyzylorda Region in southern Kazakhstan. The administrative center of the district is the urban-type settlement of Ayteke Bi. Population:

See also
 Kazaly, a town in Kazaly district

References

Districts of Kazakhstan
Kyzylorda Region